Réka-Luca Jani and Christina Shakovets were the defending champions, having won the event in 2012, but Jani decided not to participate. Shakovets partnered up with Alona Fomina as the fourth seeds, but they lost in the first round.

Maria Elena Camerin and Anja Prislan won the title, defeating Anna Zaja and Maša Zec Peškirič in the final, 7–5, 6–2.

Seeds

Draw

References 
 Draw

Telavi Open - Doubles
2013 in Georgian sport
Telavi Open